Cloudesley is  an 1830 novel by William Godwin.

Cloudesley may also refer to:

People
 Cloudesley Brereton (1863–1937), British educationalist and writer
 M. A. Cloudesley Brereton (1872–1946), British feminist and sanitary reformer
 Cloudesley Dewar Bullock (C. D. B.) Marsham (1835–1915), English amateur cricketer
 Cloudesley Henry Bullock (C. H. B.) Marsham (1879–1928), English amateur cricketer, son of C. D. B.
 Cloudesley Varyl Robinson (1883–1959), British Royal Navy officer
 Cloudesley Brereton Sharpe (1904–1993),English first-class cricketer
 Cloudesley Shovell  (1650–1707), English Royal Navy officer

Places
 Cloudesley Square, a square in the Barnsbury district of Islington, North London

See also
 John Cloudsley-Thompson (1921–2013), British naturalist